12 Rounds 3: Lockdown (also known as 12 Rounds 3 or 12 Rounds: Lockdown) is a 2015 American action film directed by Stephen Reynolds and starring Dean Ambrose in his film debut. It is the sequel to the 2013 film 12 Rounds 2: Reloaded, the third and final installment in the 12 Rounds trilogy, and the second of six films (titled the "Action Six-Pack" series) to be co-produced by WWE Studios and Lionsgate, who distribute the film. It is the first film in the series not to be released by 20th Century Fox, and was released in select theaters across the United States and on demand on September 11, 2015.

Plot

Detective Tyler Burke  and his two men infiltrate the house of drug dealer George Freemont, with whom he had been secretly collaborating to sell police-confiscated narcotics. They ask him for Freemont's proof of their collaboration. They destroy Freemont's laptop, and Burke shoots Freemont after making it look like Freemont shot first. Detective John Shaw returns to active duty at his precinct after the death of his partner, Ray Jones, in which Shaw was shot and sidelined with post traumatic stress disorder. He is met by his supervisor, Captain Ellen Matthews, recent police academy graduate Officer Jenny Taylor and lastly Detective Burke, who is being hailed for busting Freemont.

Unknown to Burke, Freemont had made a backup containing the incriminating evidence that is in the form of a flash drive in the shape of a credit card, which is found during Freemont's autopsy and delivered to Evidence by Taylor. Shaw reads the incident report of the Freemont bust and retrieves the flash drive from Evidence. At the same time, Burke, at his home, receives a call from Taylor regarding the flash drive. Burke deduces that the flash drive contains the evidence and quickly heads to the precinct. Discovering the content of the flash drive, Shaw heads to Matthews' office. Burke receives word from Officer Meeks, one of his corrupt colleagues, that Shaw had already checked out the flash drive, but misses Shaw though both men shared the same elevator. Burke is unable to intercept Shaw and triggers the fire alarm so that everyone (except he and his fellow corrupt cops) can evacuate the building and find Shaw easily. Once the building is evacuated, Officer Darrow takes over the security hub to monitor Shaw's whereabouts via CCTV and also initiates a total lockdown of the building, disabling all the phone communication, computer networks as well as jamming cell phone signals. Shaw, unable to find Matthews at her office, had ducked into a stairwell to call her on his cell, but is cut off by the lockdown.

Shaw, knowing that he is now being hunted, ambushes Meeks but is surprised by Burke. Shaw uses Meeks as a shield, but Meeks is shot anyway by Burke. Shaw and Meeks duck into an elevator. Shaw tries to save Meeks, but Meeks dies soon after. Burke radios Darrow to shut down the elevators, but Shaw manages to escape. Shaw next runs into Taylor, who had been accidentally locked in. She sees Meeks' blood on Shaw and refuses to trust him, forcing him to draw his gun on her. He confiscated her taser and leaves her with a warning to hide until the lockdown is over. Matthews arrives and hails Burke over walkie talkie. Burke takes the opportunity to frame Shaw, directly blaming him for Meeks' death and assuring Matthews that he will handle Shaw. Shaw then goes into the motor pool where is spotted by Darrow on the camera. In the ensuring pursuit, Shaw is hit by the bullet to his arm while attempting to flee in an unmarked police car, but manages to elude his pursuers.

Taylor next runs into Burke, who invites her to walk with him to the security control. Burke tells Shaw through the PA system to show himself in the CCTV camera or else he will shoot Taylor. Shaw reveals himself and after sending his men after Shaw, Burke shoots Taylor anyway and the gunshot is heard by Shaw. Burke and his fellow corrupt cops don SWAT armor and weaponry and went out to corner Shaw in a Crime Lab where Shaw had been bandaging his arm. Shaw is pinned down but managed to escape using Taylor's taser to stun a dead corrupt cop to fire an assault rifle that caused an explosion nearby on an experiment table, killing one corrupt cop but narrowly saved Burke and the others. Police Chief Keppler arrives and takes charge of the situation from Matthews, informing Burke that there is a SWAT team inbound.

Shaw heads to the server room and disconnects several wires to disable the CCTV cameras. Shaw then reactivates the network in order to upload the evidence regarding Burke to Internal Affairs. Darrow notices that the network is activated and after alerting Burke, managed to deactivate the network before the evidence is sent. Shaw goes to the rooftop in order to get a signal and make a call to Matthews. Shaw convinces Matthews that he is the innocent and Burke is corrupt. He is interrupted by one of Burke's henchmen, Gideon, and after a brief fight succeeds in escaping again.

Shaw manages to ambush a lone Burke and cuffs him and both men enter an elevator. Burke secretly has its own key and manages to unlock the cuffs and after a struggle, Shaw is forced to escape but not before being shot in the hip. The SWAT Team arrived on scene to prepare for the raid. Shaw then goes to the office again to bandage his hip. Burke and 2 henchmen catch up with Shaw, who succeeds in escaping again. Police Chief Keppler radios Burke that SWAT will enter once they cut the power.

Darrow and Burke manage to ambush and capture Shaw, whom they bring to a meeting room. Burke succeeds in getting the flash drive from Shaw and promptly destroys it. Just as Burke is about to shoot Shaw, the power is cut and Shaw manages to use the distraction to escape.

After a brief encounter with the SWAT Team, Shaw calls Matthews to meet her at the back of the building. After meeting up, Matthews turns heel and reveals her alliance with Burke. Burke then shoots Matthews before the SWAT Team bursts inside. As Shaw is about to be arrested, he plays a recording of Burke's earlier monologue in which Burke incriminates himself. Burke attempts to shoot Shaw but Shaw fires his last round to Burke's leg. Shaw then cuffs Burke and walks out of the building.

Cast
 Dean Ambrose as Detective John Shaw
 Roger Cross as Detective Tyler Burke
 Daniel Cudmore as Gideon
 Lochlyn Munro as Darrow
 Ty Olsson as Harris
 Sarah Smyth as Officer Jenny Taylor 
 Rebecca Marshall as Captain Ellen Matthews
 Toby Levins as Meeks
 Bill Dow as Police Chief Keppler
 Sharon Taylor as Carmen
 Matthew Harrison as George Freemont

Reception
Jason Best of What's on TV gave it 2 out of 5 and wrote: "Die Hard in a police station is a nifty idea but it is wasted on this by-the-numbers installment of the WWE action-movie franchise". Martin Tsai of the Los Angeles Times wrote: "Written by Bobby Lee Darby and Nathan Brookes, the new film is a sequel to 12 Rounds in name only".

References

External links
 

2015 films
2015 action films
American action films
2010s English-language films
Films shot in Vancouver
Lionsgate films
American police detective films
American sequel films
WWE Studios films
2010s police procedural films
12 Rounds films
2010s American films